Josef Mifsud (born 7 September 1984 in Sliema, Malta) is a former professional footballer and an accredited physical education teacher. As a footballer, he played as a defender.

Playing career

Sliema Wanderers
Mifsud began his career as a product of the Sliema Wanderers youth team, but following some impressive displays, he got his chance to play for the first team by making his debut during the 2001–02 season, he made two appearances during the season, but failed to score, as Sliema Wanderers finished 3rd in the Maltese Premier League.

For the 2002–03 season, Josef made one further appearance, but again failed to score any goals, as Sliema Wanderers finished as champions in the Maltese Premier League.

Josef never really made his mark for Sliema Wanderers and spent some time on loan with Lija Athletic in a bid to gain some first team experience.

During his time with Sliema Wanderers, Mifsud only made three appearances, but failed to score any goals.

Msida Saint-Joseph
In the summer of 2003, Josef Mifsud moved to Msida Saint-Joseph in a bid to play more first team football, he began the 2003–04 season slotting into the Msida Saint-Joseph defence well and made 17 appearances, but failed to score any goals, as Msida Saint-Joseph narrowly avoided relegation finishing 8th in the Maltese Premier League.

Mifsud established himself firmly as a first team regular for the 2004–05 season, making 23 appearances, but again failing to score. His contribution helped Msida Saint-Joseph to another 8th-place finish as the club avoided relegation once again.

With the profile of Josef rising, he entered the 2005–06 season hoping to gain a mid table finish with Msida Saint-Joseph, and get them away from the dreaded relegation group, and he managed to do so, as Msida Saint-Joseph finished in the championship group, in 6th position. During the season Josef made 24 appearances, without finding the net.

Mifsud hoped to build on an impressive season with Msida Saint-Joseph, and continued to perform with a string of fine performances for Msida Saint-Joseph, as the club again finished in the championship group, in 6th position, with Mifsud making 27 appearances and again failing to score. Josef's performances didn't go unnoticed and was given his chance to play for the Maltese national team and made his debut in 2007.

Mifsud played for Msida Saint-Joseph for four seasons and in total made 91 appearances, but failed to score any goals.

Valletta
With Josef being branded as one of the best home grown defenders in the Maltese Premier League, he joined Valletta in the summer of 2007, for the 2007–08 season, Mifsud made 25 appearances and scored two goals, as Valletta won the Maltese Premier League title.

For the 2008–09 season, first-team chances diminished in his second season, mainly down to the signing of Luke Dimech, Mifsud made 13 appearances during the season, but failed to find the net as Valletta missed out on the title to Hibernians.

During his time with Valletta, Josef made 38 appearances and scored his first two goals in the Maltese Premier League.

Sliema Wanderers
In June, 2009, Sliema Wanderers announced their first signing of the close season, securing the services of the Valletta defender Josef Mifsud, with the player signing a five-year contract.

Mifsud made his Premier League debut for Sliema Wanderers on 30 August 2009 in a 1–0 defeat to Qormi.

International career

Malta
Josef Mifsud made his international debut for Malta during his time as a Msida Saint-Joseph player. He was used in a friendly match against Armenia on 12 September 2007, however Malta lost the match 1–0.

Honours

Sliema Wanderers
 Maltese Premier League winner: 2002–03

Valletta
 Maltese Premier League winner: 2007–08

Career statistics

Statistics accurate as of match played 1 August 2013.

References

External links
 Josef Mifsud at MaltaFootball.com
 

1984 births
Living people
Maltese footballers
Malta international footballers
Sliema Wanderers F.C. players
Lija Athletic F.C. players
Msida Saint-Joseph F.C. players
Valletta F.C. players
Tarxien Rainbows F.C. players
People from Sliema
Competitors at the 2005 Mediterranean Games
Association football defenders
Mediterranean Games competitors for Malta